Qujiu (zhuang: Gizgiu Cin) is a town under the administration of Fusui County in southern Guangxi Zhuang Autonomous Region, China. , it had an area of  populated by 28,000 people residing in 1 residential communities and 10 villages.

Administrative divisions
There are 1 residential communities and 10 villages:

Residential communities:
 Qujiu(渠旧社区)

Villages:
 Lailu(濑滤村), Tuonong(驮弄村), Tuoya(驮迓村), Sanhe(三合村), Nongbu(弄卜村), Qutun (渠吞村), Zhongyuan(中原村), Zhuqin(竹琴村), Chongbian(崇边村), Busha(布沙村)

See also
List of township-level divisions of Guangxi

References

External links
 Qujiu Town/Official website of Qujiu

Towns of Guangxi
Fusui County